Benny K B Kwok is the author of a series of published titles in print worldwide - Forensic Accountancy 1st & 2nd Editions Financial Analysis in Hong Kong 1st & 2nd Editions, "Business Terms & Phrases for Surveyors, Engineers & Facilities Managers in Hong Kong" (Knowledge Conservation 2016)  and Accounting Irregularities in Financial Statements.

Kwok worked in the United Kingdom during the 1980s and 1990s, and is based in Hong Kong as an independent forensic expert or forensic accountant in litigation support, dispute analysis and fraud investigation.

Kwok is a regular speaker at university conferences, media interviews and professional seminars, including those held by The University of Hong Kong, Hong Kong Polytechnic University, Metro Broadcast Corporation, Law Society of Hong Kong, Hong Kong Institute of Surveyors  and Hong Kong Institute of Certified Public Accountants.

Mr Kwok's contributions in this field last year (2014) include articles published by:
 The Institute of Chartered Accountants in England and Wales 
   Forensic accountancy in Hong Kong: Trends in a Decade at:   
 The Actuarial Society of Hong Kong 
   Quantum Assessment of Losses of Inventories by Forensic Accountants at:   
 The Hong Kong Institute of Certified Public Accountants: 
   Quantum Assessment of Losses of Inventories by Forensic CPAs (Certified Public Accountants) at:

References

Living people
Year of birth missing (living people)